Architectonica perdix, common name the partridge sundial, is a species of sea snail, a marine gastropod mollusc in the family Architectonicidae, the sundials.

Description
Architectonica perdix has a shell that reaches 65–83 mm in maximum dimension. This shell is low-spired and quite flattened, with a beaded surface. It has seven flatly convex whorls and the  base of shell is slight convex in the centre. The sutures are finely incised. The basic shell color is cream, with brown spots.

Distribution
This species can be found in Madagascar, Tanzania, southeastern India, Sri Lanka, northern China, Australia and the central Pacific Ocean area.

Habitat
Architectonica perdix lives on sandy bottoms, at depths of 10–60 m.

References 

 WoRMS
 
 Sealifebase
 Australian Museum
 Bigai.world

Architectonicidae
Gastropods described in 1844